The 1983 Cal State Fullerton Titans football team represented California State University, Fullerton as a member of the Pacific Coast Athletic Association (PCAA) during the 1983 NCAA Division I-A football season. Led by fourth-year head coach Gene Murphy, Cal State Fullerton finished the season with an overall record of 7–5 and a mark of 5–1 in conference play, winning the PCAA title. As conference champion, the Titans were invited to play in the California Bowl in Fresno, California against the champion of the Mid-American Conference (MAC), Northern Illinois. Cal State Fullerton won the game, 20–13.

Cal State Fullerton home stadium in 1983 was supposed to be Anaheim Stadium in Anaheim, California. However, only one of the three home games was played there. The other two games were moved to Glover Stadium in Anaheim due to weather issues.

After the 1984 season was over, it was discovered that the UNLV Rebels had used multiple ineligible players during both the 1983 and 1984 seasons. As a result, UNLV forfeited their victory over Cal State Fuller in 1983, improve the Titans' record to 8–4 overall and 6–0 PCAA play.

Schedule

Team players in the NFL
The following Cal State Fullerton players were selected in the 1984 NFL Draft.

References

Cal State Fullerton
Cal State Fullerton Titans football seasons
Big West Conference football champion seasons
Cal State Fullerton Titans football